Hypericum cuisinii is a perennial herb in the genus Hypericum, in the section Adenosepalum. The herb has pale yellow flowers and occurs in Greece and Turkey.

Description 
The plant is cespitose and decumbent, with a woody taproot. The green and terete stems have a whitish pubescence below the inflorescences. The chartaceous leaves have pale pubescent to pruinose undersides and are puberulous or glabrous above. The leaves are typically flat or have recurved margins. The leaf apices are rounded, the margins are entire, and the bases are rounded. The leaves have two lateral veins that curve upwards from the lower midrib, and dense tertiary reticulation that is rather obscure.

The dense, cylindrical to subcorymbose inflorescences have one to seven flowers, rarely up to twenty-one. The linear-lanceolate to linear-elliptic bracts and bracteoles have black glandular cilia, with the basal cilia more lengthy. The three-veined sepals are or somewhat united, have glandular cilia, and are spotted with black dots. The petals have pale laminar glands but lack marginal glands, and are spotted with black dots. The stamens are not grouped into stamen fascicles. The petals twist together and enclose the capsules while they develop.

Distribution and habitat 
Hypericum cuisinii occurs in Greece and Turkey. In Greece it grows in Khios, Ikaria, Karpathos, and Kasos, and in Turkey it grows in Izmir.

References 

Plants described in 1886
cuisinii
Flora of Greece
Flora of Turkey